Shuford is a surname. Notable people with the surname include:

Alonzo C. Shuford (1858–1933), American politician
George A. Shuford (1895–1962), American politician
Jacob L. Shuford, American admiral
Reggie Shuford, American lawyer

See also
Shuford Stadium, a stadium in North Carolina in the United States